Jamal Kakakhel was a Pakistani regional politician, social worker and the chief of his tribe "Kakakhel" at village Dandoka.

Political life
In 1951, the Governor of NWFP, Khurshid Ali Khan visited to him at his village and was impressed by his work as "Judicial Assessor". He said:

Further reading
 The Hund, annual magazine of Government Post Graduate College Swabi.
 The Daily Swabi Times, 21 June 2008. Veteran Personality, Hazrat Jamal Kakakhel expires.

References

Pakistani politicians
Year of birth missing
Year of death missing
People from Swabi District
Pakistani Muslims
Pashtun people
Deaths from kidney failure